Huon Island is an island with an area of 47 hectares in south-eastern Australia.  It is part of the Partridge Island Group, lying close to the south-eastern coast of Tasmania, in the D'Entrecasteaux Channel between Bruny Island and the mainland.  The island has a small human population and has been subjected to intensive agricultural activities in the past. The Nuenonne name of the island is Prahree.

Flora and fauna
The vegetation is dominated by introduced grasses and bracken with some large, scattered white gums in the north-west.  Recorded breeding seabird species are little penguin and short-tailed shearwater.  European rabbits have been introduced to the island.  The metallic skink is present.

History
The first European to sight Huon Island was M. de Cretin, one of D’Entrecasteaux's officers, on May 2, 1792.

References

Islands of Tasmania
South East Tasmania